The Cromer Covered Courts Championships or formally the Cromer Covered Courts Tournament or simply the Cromer Covered Courts was an open men's and women's international indoor Clay tennis tournament founded in 1925. The tournament featured two editions of the event, one was held in the autumn known, and was known as the Cromer Covered Courts Autumn Meeting  and the other in the spring. The tournaments were organised by the Cromer Covered Courts Club and held at the indoor courts at Newhaven Court, Cromer, Norfolk, England. The event ran until 1965.

History
The Cromer Covered Courts was an open men's and women's international indoor Hardcourt (clay) tennis tournament founded in 1925. The tournament feature two editions of the event the first was held in autumn usually in October or November, this event being the oldest of the two was known as the Cromer Covered Courts Autumn Meeting. 

The second edition was started in 1934 and was held usually in the spring in April. In January 1963 the Newhaven Court Hotel was destroyed by a fire. Two years later in 1965 after a blaze destroyed the hotel, another fire destroyed covered tennis courts in the grounds.

Previous winners of the men's singles of the spring meeting included; Mohammed Sleem, Murray Deloford, Ignacy Tłoczyński, Eric Filby and Dieter Schultheiss Former winners of the autumn meeting included; Henry Mayes, Fred Perry, Ted Avory, Don Butler, Jack Harper, George Godsell and Wladyslaw Skonecki.

Venue
The Cromer Lawn Tennis Club was founded in 1907 and twelve grass courts were laid down on land adjacent to Norwich Road, Cromer. In 1908 the club staged its first open tournament. In August 1919 the club became the venue for the resumed Norfolk Championships. In 1925 the club had constructed two indoor courts built at Newhaven Court at a cost of £10,000 (or £777,823.40 today). In 1926 some events of the Norfolk championships were transferred indoors due to severe rain delays. The club is still operating today.

References

Clay court tennis tournaments
Defunct tennis tournaments in the United Kingdom
Indoor tennis tournaments